Marriage of the Blessed is a 1988 Iranian film directed by Mohsen Makhmalbaf about Haji, a young soldier of the Iran–Iraq War, and his inability to adapt to civilian life after his release from the hospital.

References

External links
 

Films directed by Mohsen Makhmalbaf
1980s Persian-language films
Iranian war films
Iran–Iraq War films

1988 films